Arabe ('Arabic' or 'Arab' in French) or Árabe (in Spanish and Portuguese) may refer to:
 French ship Arabe, several ships with the name
 C.D. Árabe Unido, a Panamanian football club
 Cristhian Árabe, Bolivian footballer

See also 
 El árabe, a Mexican telenovela
 Arab (disambiguation)
 Arrabe (disambiguation)